Landsverk L-100 was a Swedish prototype tank in development during World War II. It had a crew of two, and its armament consisted of a 20 mm gun or one 6.5 mm machine gun. Top speed was around 55 km/h, and the vehicle weighed almost 5 tons. The Landsverk L-100 was never adopted by the Swedish Army.

References 
http://mailer.fsu.edu/~akirk/tanks/swe/Swedish.htm 

World War II light tanks
Light tanks of Sweden